Helen Hogan Coome was a notable British-American female organist.

She was a pupil of or connected to Marco Enrico Bossi, Joseph Bonnet, and Charles Marie Widor. She was the organist at Central Congregational Church in Providence, Rhode Island from 1908-1928. In 1933, she married Englishman Cecil V. Coome and moved to London, where she was born.

During World War II, she helped residents of London recover from the bombings of The Blitz. During this time, she commissioned a stained glass pendant for Central Congregational Church in gratitude for the church's work helping England during the war. The pendant has resided in the sanctuary of Central Church since 1950.

References

American organists
Women organists
British organists
Year of birth missing
Year of death missing